The Dallas Cup, is an annual international football tournament for invited youth teams. The tournament was established in 1980 and is held in Dallas, Texas, with FC Dallas serving as its host club. Venues used for the tournament include the Cotton Bowl and Toyota Stadium. The Dallas Cup includes divisions ranging from U-12 to U-19 in the Boys' tournament and U-15 through U-19 in the Dallas Cup Girls' Invitational presented by Mary Kay, which features girls' age groups. The Panama national U-20 team is the current champion of the elite U19 Gordon Jago Super Group. The first ever Dallas Cup saw an English club side from South London, St. Thomas More, win the U14 cup and elite international competition has been a cornerstone for the tournament ever since.

List of Supergroup champions 

The elite U19 Super Group was founded in 1990. The country of Brazil has the most Super Group champions. View full list of Dallas Cup champions.

Titles by team

Titles by country

Notable players

Players that participated in the Dallas Cup who later played on professional teams and national teams

References

External links 
Official website

 
Youth soccer cup competitions in the United States
American soccer friendly trophies
Sports competitions in Dallas
Soccer in Texas